Gerd Haxhiu (born 11 October 1972) is an Albanian football coach who has managed Apolonia Fier, Bylis Ballsh, Skënderbeu Korçë, Besa Kavajë.

References

1972 births
Living people
Albanian football managers
Flamurtari Vlorë managers
KF Apolonia Fier managers
KF Bylis Ballsh managers
KF Skënderbeu Korçë managers
FK Partizani Tirana managers
Besa Kavajë managers
Luftëtari Gjirokastër managers
KF Korabi Peshkopi managers
Kategoria Superiore managers
Kategoria e Parë managers
Albanian expatriate football managers
Expatriate football managers in Montenegro
Albanian expatriates in Montenegro